The Prime Minister's Prize for Hebrew Literary Works, also known as the Levi Eshkol Literary Award, named after Israel's third Prime Minister, is an annual award granted to writers in the Hebrew language. The prize was established in 1969.

About the prize 
The stated purpose of the award is to "appreciate Hebrew literature and encourage excellence in Hebrew literary writing," by providing a financial grant to writers, which would enable them to be free to write for a year. The grant, as of 2016, is NIS 65,000 – the equivalent of a teacher's annual salary. The award was founded by Prime Minister Levi Eshkol and initiated by writer Zelig Lavon, Pinhas Lavon's brother.

The award is granted by the Ministry of Culture from its budget and in accordance with the regulations drawn up by the Ministry, according to which, every three years, a seven-member trustee board is appointed, including three representatives of the Minister of Culture and Sport and four from the Hebrew Writers Association, with a chairperson appointed annually by the Minister. The board appoints a three-member selection committee, which selects up to 14 award recipients per year by majority vote. 

The winners are announced in December of the year ending before the calendar year during which the award stipend is provided (hence, for example, 2020 award winners were announced in December 2019).

Winners

1960s

1970s

1980s

1990s

2000s

2010s

2020s

References

External links 

 Rules of the Prime Minister's Prize for Hebrew Literary Works award  (Hebrew)

Israeli literary awards
Lists of Israeli award winners
Awards established in 1969
Israeli culture
Israeli awards